Hog Lake is a natural freshwater lake in the Sun 'N Lakes community, in Highlands County, Florida. About  of this is a manmade island inside the lake. The lake is directly north of the Sun 'N Lakes community center and is inside a park. The country club restaurant is directly north of the lake.

The island inside Hog Lake may be reached by a wooden footbridge.  A  pier is on the north side of the island.  Swimming and boating are not allowed on Hog Lake.  Fishing is allowed on the pier.

References

Lakes of Highlands County, Florida
Lakes of Florida